Bibb County Courthouse is a historic county courthouse in Centreville, Alabama, county seat of Bibb County, Alabama. It was built in 1902.

See also
List of county courthouses in Alabama

References

County courthouses in Alabama
Government buildings completed in 1902
Buildings and structures in Bibb County, Alabama
Historic district contributing properties in Alabama
1902 establishments in Alabama
National Register of Historic Places in Bibb County, Alabama